Mario Rolando Pini Stagi (15 October 1938 – 17 April 2021) was an Uruguayan professional footballer who played as a defender.

Career
Born in Fray Bentos, Pini began his career with Montevideo Wanderers, and later played in Spain for Real Valladolid, Mallorca and Sabadell.

References

1938 births
2021 deaths
Uruguayan footballers
Montevideo Wanderers F.C. players
Real Valladolid players
RCD Mallorca players
CE Sabadell FC footballers
La Liga players
Segunda División players
Association football defenders
Uruguayan expatriate footballers
Uruguayan expatriates in Spain
Expatriate footballers in Spain
People from Fray Bentos